Pierre Nils Daniel Hedin (born 19 February 1978) is a Swedish retired professional ice hockey defenceman.

Playing career
Hedin began his career with Modo Hockey and made his debut for the senior team during the 1996-97 Elitserien season. He was drafted 239th overall by the Toronto Maple Leafs in the 1999 NHL Entry Draft and played three games for the Leafs during the 2003-04 NHL season before returning to Modo Hockey.

Hedin also played in Germany for Adler Mannheim and in Switzerland for HC Ambrì-Piotta before returning to Modo for a third spell. He would finish his career in Sweden with Södertälje SK and Timrå IK.

He was also a member of the Sweden national team for the 2002 IIHF World Championship.

Career statistics

Regular season and playoffs

International

External links
 
 Hedin retires (Swedish)

1978 births
Adler Mannheim players
HC Ambrì-Piotta players
Living people
Modo Hockey players
People from Örnsköldsvik Municipality
St. John's Maple Leafs players
Södertälje SK players
Swedish expatriate ice hockey players in Canada
Swedish expatriate ice hockey players in Germany
Swedish expatriate sportspeople in Switzerland
Swedish ice hockey defencemen
Timrå IK players
Toronto Maple Leafs draft picks
Toronto Maple Leafs players
Sportspeople from Västernorrland County